The following list includes notable people who were born or have lived in Oak Park, Illinois. For a similar list organized alphabetically by last name, see the category page People from Oak Park, Illinois.

Academics and sciences 

 Lee Archambault (b. 1960), astronaut
 A. O. L. Atkin (1925-2008), mathematician
 Dmitri Borgmann (1927-1985), logologist
 Wallace Broecker (1931-2019), geochemist
 Jeannette Howard Foster  (1895-1981),  librarian and professor, born in Oak Park
 Emil Frei (1924-2014), oncologist
 Percy Julian (1899-1975), chemist
 Joseph Kerwin (b. 1932), astronaut
 Randy Kryn (b. 1949), Civil Rights Movement historian
 Vera Pless (1931-2020), mathematician
 Carl Rogers (1902-1987), psychologist, author and researcher
 Bruce Schneier (b. 1963), cryptographer
 John Robert Schrieffer (1931-2019), physicist
 John C. Slater (1900-1976), pioneer in quantum theory
Susan Subak, environmental scientist and author 
 Chad Trujillo (b. 1973), astronomer
 Edward Wagenknecht (1900-2004), educator and author

Arts and culture

Architecture 

 Thomas H. Beeby, architect
 Marion Mahony Griffin, architect
 Walter Burley Griffin, architect
 E.E. Roberts, architect
 Louis Sauer, architect
 John Van Bergen, architect
 Frank Lloyd Wright, architect and writer

Dance 

 Heléne Alexopoulos, ballet dancer
 Doris Humphrey, choreographer and dancer

Illustrating 

 Gene Ha, comic book artist
 Chris Ware, cartoonist
 Rick Yager, cartoonist

Painting and sculpture 

 Leslie Erganian, painter
 Mary Agnes Yerkes, Impressionist painter

Photography 

 Bruce Davidson, photographer
 Esther Henderson, photographer

Writing 

 Yashar Ali, journalist 
 Jacob M. Appel, author of Einstein's Beach House (lived in Oak Park, 1997–2004)
 Richard Bach, writer (Jonathan Livingston Seagull)
 Bruce Barton, author of best-selling book The Man Nobody Knows 
 Edgar Rice Burroughs, author, creator of Tarzan and John Carter of Mars
 Kenneth Fearing, poet and author (The Big Clock)
 Jane Hamilton, author The Book of Ruth
 Ernest Hemingway, author (For Whom the Bell Tolls, The Old Man and the Sea)
 Leicester Hemingway, writer; younger brother of Ernest Hemingway
 Kara Jackson, poet, musician
 Tymoteusz Karpowicz, poet and playwright
 Agnes Newton Keith, writer
 E. E. Knight, writer
 John Frush Knox, memoirist
 Alex Kotlowitz, journalist and writer
 Steven Levitt, co-author of Freakonomics
 Charles MacArthur, journalist and film-writer
 Caroline Myss, author
 Edith Nash, writer
 Sandra Novack, author
 Jerry Saltz, art critic
 Carol Shields, author
 Charles Simic, fifteenth Poet Laureate of the United States

Music
Matt B, singer-songwriter

Crime 

 Armando Fosco, alleged member of the Chicago Outfit
 Sam Giancana, mafia crime boss
 Tony Spilotro, alleged mafia enforcer

Business 

 Allan Cox, author and business leader
 James Dewar, baker; inventor of the Twinkie
 Donald F. Duncan, Sr., parking meter and Yo-yo manufacturer
 Ray Kroc, founder of McDonald's
 Richard Sears, founder of Sears, catalogue innovator 
 Robert Wahl, two-time All-American and former president of Valmont Industries

Media

Acting and comedy 

 William Bishop, actor
 Daws Butler, voice artist of animated characters including Yogi Bear, Huckleberry Hound
 Dan Castellaneta, actor and voice of cartoon character Homer Simpson
 Anna Chlumsky, actress (My Girl, Veep)
 Johnny Galecki, actor (The Big Bang Theory, Roseanne, National Lampoon's Christmas Vacation)
 Mason Gamble, actor (Dennis the Menace, Rushmore)
 Kathy Griffin, actress and comedian
 Julie Haydon, actress
 Thomas Lennon, actor and screenwriter
 Ted Levine, actor (The Silence of the Lambs, Monk)
 Deanna Lund, actress (Land of the Giants)
 John Mahoney, actor (Eight Men Out, Frasier, Atlantis: The Lost Empire)
 Sally Mansfield, actress (Rocky Jones, Space Ranger)
 Mary Elizabeth Mastrantonio, actress (Scarface, The Color of Money)
 Amy Morton, actress (Chicago P.D.)
 Lois Nettleton, actress
 Bob Newhart, comedian and actor (The Bob Newhart Show, Newhart)
 Kate Norby, actress (The Devil's Rejects)
 Busy Philipps, actress (Dawson's Creek)
 Cecily Strong, actress, comedian (Saturday Night Live)
 Judy Tenuta, comedian
 Betty White, actress (The Mary Tyler Moore Show, The Golden Girls)

Directing and producing 

 John Avildsen, film director (Rocky, The Karate Kid)
 Steve James, documentary filmmaker 
 George Schaefer, television director (Hallmark Hall of Fame)
 John Sturges, filmmaker (The Magnificent Seven, The Great Escape)

Journalism 

 Tavi Gevinson, fashion blogger
 Peter Sagal, host of NPR's Wait Wait… Don't Tell Me!
 Gene Sherman, Pulitzer Prize-winning reporter
 Alfred Henry Spink, founder of The Sporting News, lived and died in Oak Park
 Hannah Storm, television personality and sportscaster
 Dorothy Thompson, journalist
Marjorie Vincent, 1991 Miss America, journalist

Military 

 William J. Cullerton, flying ace during World War II, host of Great Outdoors on WGN Radio until 1999
 Milo Smith Hascall, Union general in the Civil War

Music 

 Lane Brody, musician
 Jon Deak, bassist and composer with the New York Philharmonic
 Rev. William R. Emerson, formerly R&B singer Billy "The Kid" Emerson
 Matthew and Eleanor Friedberger of the indie rock band The Fiery Furnaces
 Bud Herseth, principal trumpet with the Chicago Symphony Orchestra; charter member Trumpet Hall of Fame
 Mia Joy, American indie rock musician
 Ludacris, rapper; attended Emerson Junior High School in Oak Park 
 Marc Okubo, guitarist of heavy metal band Veil of Maya
 Martin Pearlman, classical musician and composer
 Landon Pigg, singer-songwriter
 Felix Wurman, classical cellist and composer

Politics and law 

 Theresa Amato, Nader 2000 and Nader 2004 national presidential campaign manager
 Henry W. Austin, Illinois state legislator and businessman
 David Axelrod, political strategist and former White House official
 Ralph H. Barger, Illinois state legislator
 Bruce Barton, author and advertising pioneer; congressman from New York (1937–1940)
 Redd Griffin, Illinois state legislator (1980–1982)
 John Frush Knox, clerk to United States Supreme Court Justice James Clark McReynolds; memoirist
 Eric D. Miller, Judge of the United States Court of Appeals for the Ninth Circuit
 Dick Murphy, 33rd Mayor of San Diego
 Pat Quinn, 41st Governor of Illinois
 Phil Radford, environmental activist; Executive Director of Greenpeace USA; raised in Oak Park
 Leland Rayson, Illinois state legislator and lawyer
 Walter J. Reum, Illinois state legislator and lawyer
 Gerald W. Shea, Illinois state legislator
 John D. Tomlinson, Minnesota state legislator and businessman
 Greg Zito, Illinois state legislator

Religion 

 William Eugene Blackstone, 19th-century evangelical Christian and Zionist; lived in Oak Park
 Edward Egan, retired Roman Catholic Cardinal Archbishop of the Diocese of New York [City]
 Louis Francescon, missionary and pioneer of the Italian Pentecostal Movement; lived and died in Oak Park
 Andrew Greeley, Catholic priest and author; born in Oak Park (1928)

Sports

Baseball 

 Dick Bertell, catcher for Chicago Cubs and San Francisco Giants
 Art Bramhall, third baseman for Philadelphia Phillies
 Shirley Danz, outfielder with All-American Girls Professional Baseball League
 Jim Dorsey, pitcher for California Angels and Boston Red Sox
 Tony Fiore, pitcher for Tampa Bay Devil Rays and Minnesota Twins
 Justin Huisman, relief pitcher for Kansas City Royals
 Sean Lawrence, pitcher for Pittsburgh Pirates
 Lee Pfund, pitcher for Brooklyn Dodgers
 Johnny Rigney, pitcher and general manager for the Chicago White Sox
 Brian Schlitter, pitcher for Chicago Cubs
 John Sevcik, catcher for Minnesota Twins
 Ben Shelton, outfielder for the Pittsburgh Pirates
 Marv Staehle, second baseman for Chicago White Sox, Montréal Expos and Atlanta Braves
 Craig Stimac, catcher for San Diego Padres
 Bill Stoneman, pitcher for California Angels, Chicago Cubs and Montreal Expos, general manager of Angels
 Joe Tinker, Hall of Fame shortstop for Chicago Orphans/Cubs, Cincinnati Reds and Chicago Chi-Feds/Whales
 Mike York, pitcher for Pittsburgh Pirates and Cleveland Indians

Basketball 

 Ashraf Amaya, forward for the Washington Bullets, Vancouver Grizzlies, and several international teams
Gabe Levin (born 1994), American-Israeli basketball player in the Israeli Basketball Premier League
 Corey Maggette, small forward and shooting guard for five NBA teams
 Jimmy Rodgers, head coach, Minnesota Timberwolves, Boston Celtics
 Iman Shumpert, guard for the 2016 NBA champion Cleveland Cavaliers
 Evan Turner, guard and small forward for the Indiana Pacers, Philadelphia 76ers, and Portland Trail Blazers
 Norm Van Lier, point guard for the Chicago Bulls; sports radio personality

Football 

 Andy Frederick, offensive lineman, played for Super Bowl championship teams of Chicago Bears
 Eric Kumerow, linebacker for the Miami Dolphins and Chicago Bears and Dallas Cowboys
 Johnny Lattner, halfback for Notre Dame Fighting Irish football, 1953 Heisman Trophy winner
 Milt McColl, linebacker for San Francisco 49ers and Los Angeles Raiders
 Mike Shanahan, head coach for the Los Angeles Raiders, Denver Broncos and Washington Redskins; three-time Super Bowl winner
 Marques Sullivan, NFL offensive lineman with the Buffalo Bills, New York Giants and New England Patriots
 George Trafton, Hall of Fame center for the Chicago Bears
 Bob Zuppke, head football coach, University of Illinois

Ice hockey 

 Joe Corvo, defenseman for several NHL teams

Ice skating

Emery Lehman (born 1996), Olympic speed skater

Rowing 

 Carol Feeney, Olympic rower; silver medalist

Wrestling 

 Ellis Coleman, Olympic wrestler; alumnus of Oak Park and River Forest High School

References

 
Oak Park
Oak Park